House of Terror is a museum located at Andrássy út 60 in Budapest, Hungary. It contains exhibits related to the fascist and communist regimes in 20th-century Hungary and is also a memorial to the victims of these regimes, including those detained, interrogated, tortured or killed in the building.

The museum opened on 24 February 2002 and the Director-General of the museum since then has been Dr Mária Schmidt.

The House of Terror is a member organization of the Platform of European Memory and Conscience. Visitors including Zbigniew Brzezinski, Francis Fukuyama and Hayden White have praised the Museum.

Building
The building was used by the Arrow Cross Party and ÁVH.

The museum was set up under the government of Viktor Orbán. In December 2000 the Public Foundation for the Research of Central and East European History and Society purchased the building with the aim of establishing a museum in order to commemorate these two bloody periods of Hungarian history.

During the year-long construction work, the building was fully renovated inside and out. The internal design, the final look of the museum's exhibition hall, and the external facade are all the work of architect Attila F. Kovács. The reconstruction plans for the House of Terror Museum were designed by architects János Sándor and Kálmán Újszászy. The reconstruction turned the exterior of the building into somewhat of a monument; the black exterior structure (consisting of the decorative entablature, the blade walls, and the granite footpath) provides a frame for the museum, making it stand out in sharp contrast to the other buildings on Andrássy Avenue. Inside the building, the Museum has a T-54 tank on display.

Permanent exhibition
With regard to communism and fascism, the exhibition contains material on the nation's relationships to Nazi Germany and the Soviet Union. It also contains exhibits related to Hungarian organisations such as the fascist Arrow Cross Party and the communist ÁVH (which was similar to the Soviet Union KGB secret police). Part of the exhibition takes visitors to the basement, where they can see examples of the cells that the ÁVH used to break the will of their prisoners.

Much of the information and the exhibits are in Hungarian, although each room has an extensive information sheet in both English and Hungarian. Audio guides in English, German, Spanish, Russian and Italian are also available.

The background music to the exhibition was composed by former Bonanza Banzai frontman and producer Ákos Kovács. The scoring includes the work of a string orchestra, special stereophonic mixes, and sound effects.

Visitors may not take photographs or use video cameras inside of the building. There is no reduced fee for ICOM members.

Controversy

Some historians, journalists, and political scientists such as Magdalena Marsovszky or Ilse Huber have argued that the museum portrays Hungary too much as the victim of foreign occupiers and does not recognise enough the contribution that Hungarians themselves made to the regimes in question as well.
Criticism has also been raised that far more space is given to the terror of the communist regime than the fascist one. One answer to these criticisms was that while the German occupation and fascist regime of Ferenc Szálasi lasted less than a year, the Hungarian Communist regime lasted for 40 years. The museologists of the museum also reminded critics that the Hungarian Holocaust has its own museum, within three kilometres distance, so there is no need to repeat its content.

References

External links

House of Terror Budapest- English language website

2002 establishments in Hungary
Museums of communism
Fascism in Hungary
History museums in Hungary
Holocaust commemoration
Hungarian People's Republic
Museums established in 2002
Museums in Budapest
Headquarters of political parties